Byun Se-jong (Hangul:변세종) (born May 4, 1998) is a South Korean figure skater. He is bronze medalist of 2018 CS Asian Open Trophy, and competed in the free skate at two Four Continents Championships (2015, 2016).

Career

2014–15 season
Byun debuted at the Junior Grand Prix series in the 2014–15 season. He placed 9th at the JGP Czech Republic, where he got his personal best free skate and total scores. At the JGP Germany, he placed 11th. A few weeks later, Byun won the silver medal at the Ice Challenge as a junior. Back in Korea, he came in third at a qualification event, the KSU President Cup Ranking Competition, which gave him a spot to compete at the 2015 Four Continents Championships to be held in Seoul, South Korea.

At the South Korean Nationals, he settled in 5th place. In February, he competed at his first senior ISU championship, 2015 Four Continents Championships, where he achieved his new personal best in short program and total score. As the last competition of the season, Byun participated in the Triglav Trophy. In the short program, he placed first and got ratified his first triple-triple combination, triple toe-loop-triple toe-loop. Due to the big margin of points obtained in the short program, he could keep the lead and won the gold for the first time internationally.

2015–16 season
Byun began his new season at the ISU Junior Grand Prix qualifying competition held in South Korea. He placed first with a score of 161.39, which guarantees two Junior Grand Prix events. He came in fifth at a qualification event, 2015 KSU President Cup Ranking Competition, which gave him a spot to compete at the 2016 Four Continents Figure Skating Championships to be held in Taipei, Taiwan. At the 2016 Korean National Figure Skating Championships, Byun skated flawlessly, and he placed third after short programme as a result. Then, he placed fourth in total, which meant he kept his spot as the Korean national team member for the upcoming season. At the 2016 World Junior Championships he placed 29th in the short program and did not qualify to the free skating.

Programs

Competitive highlights
CS: Challenger Series; JGP: ISU Junior Grand Prix

Detailed results

Senior level

Junior level 

 Personal best highlighted in bold.

References

Further reading
 
 2014 Leo Scheu Memorial Results
 2013 Asian Figure Skating Trophy Results
 2012 Asian Figure Skating Trophy Results
 2015 Triglav Trophy Results

External links
 

1998 births
Living people
South Korean male single skaters
Sportspeople from Daegu
Competitors at the 2019 Winter Universiade